This is a list of important milestones in Kannada literature starting with Kavirajamarga (850 C.E.). These writings are the earliest available works in each listed genre. Though many notable works have been accomplished in each genre during later years, these writings are the forerunners for later developments.

The list

Notes

References

 
Indian literature-related lists
Literature of Karnataka
Literature by language